A Musical Portrait of New Orleans, a 1954 album by Jo Stafford and Frankie Laine, combine their talents in a mix of solos and duets. Paul Weston and his Orchestra provide the music.  This album was issued in the UK by Phillips under the title Floatin' Down to Cotton Town.

Track listing 

 "Way Down Yonder in New Orleans" (duet)
 "Raminay! (The New Orleans Chimney Sweep)" (Stafford solo)      
 "New Orleans" (Laine solo)
 "Jambalaya (On the Bayou)" (Stafford solo)   
 "Floatin' Down to Cotton Town" (duet)   
 "Do You Know What It Means to Miss New Orleans?" (Laine solo)    
 "Shrimp Boats" (Stafford solo)
 "Basin Street Blues" (duet)

References

Jo Stafford albums
1954 albums
Columbia Records albums
Philips Records albums
Frankie Laine albums
Albums conducted by Paul Weston
Vocal duet albums
Songs about New Orleans